Artitropa hollandi is a species of butterfly in the family Hesperiidae. It is found in northern and eastern Madagascar.

References

Butterflies described in 1916
Taxa named by Charles Oberthür
Butterflies of Africa